The Samyang 8mm F2.8 UMC Fisheye is an interchangeable camera lens made in South Korea by Samyang Optics and sold under that brand, as well as Bower and Rokinon. The available mount format are Canon EF, Fuji X, MFT, Samsung NX, Sony E.

See also
Samyang 8mm f/3.5 Fisheye CS II

References
http://www.dpreview.com/products/samyang/lenses/samyang_8_2p8/specifications

Fisheye lenses
008